Mirik (also Romanized as Mīrīk; also known as Murīd) is a village in Shakhen Rural District, in the Central District of Birjand County, South Khorasan Province, Iran. At the 2016 census, its population was 1,235, in 378 families.

References 

Populated places in Birjand County